Liberty Belle is a 1983 French drama film and is also Juliette Binoche's film debut. The film premiered at the 1983 Cannes Film Festival.

Plot
Some students get entangled with a group which opposes the French-Algerian war.

Cast 
 Jérôme Zucca as Julein
 Dominique Laffin as Elise
 André Dussolier as Vival
 Philippe Caroit as Gilles
 Jean-Pierre Kalfon as Brinon
 Anouk Ferjac as the mother
 Bernard-Pierre Donnadieu as Yvon
 Maurice Vallier as Censeur
 Fred Personne as Pasteur
 Anne-Laure Meury as Corinne
 Marcel Ophüls as German Teacher
 Juliette Binoche as girl at the rally
 Luc Béraud as The supervisor

References

External links

1983 films
1980s French-language films
Films directed by Pascal Kané
French drama films
1983 drama films
Films set in 1959
Films set in 1960
Films scored by Georges Delerue
1980s French films